Shewanella canadensis is a psychrophilic bacterium from the genus of Shewanella which has been isolated from sediments from the Atlantic Ocean.

References

Alteromonadales
Bacteria described in 2007